Eduardo "Eddie" José Zambrano (born February 1, 1966) is a Venezuelan former professional baseball player. He played parts of two Major League Baseball (MLB) seasons for the Chicago Cubs (1993–94), playing four different positions. He batted and threw right-handed.

He was the American Association MVP in 1993, leading the league with 32 home runs and 115 runs batted in. In the majors, Zambrano was a career .263 hitter (35-133), with six home runs, 20 RBI, 18 runs, seven doubles, and two stolen bases in 75 games.

Zambrano's nephew, Rougned Odor, plays in MLB.

See also
 List of Major League Baseball players from Venezuela

References

External links
, or Retrosheet, or Venezuelan Professional Baseball League

1966 births
Living people
American Association (1902–1997) MVP Award winners
Águilas del Zulia players
Buffalo Bisons (minor league) players
Cardenales de Lara players
Carolina Mudcats players
Chicago Cubs players
Greensboro Hornets players
Gulf Coast Red Sox players
Iowa Cubs players
Kinston Indians players
Langosteros de Cancún players
Major League Baseball outfielders
Major League Baseball players from Venezuela
Mexican League baseball first basemen
New Britain Red Sox players
Pawtucket Red Sox players
Petroleros de Cabimas players
Rieleros de Aguascalientes players
Sportspeople from Maracaibo
Tiburones de La Guaira players
Tigres de Aragua players
Trenton Thunder players
Venezuelan expatriate baseball players in Mexico
Venezuelan expatriate baseball players in the United States
Winter Haven Red Sox players